The Tulane University School of Liberal Arts (SLA) is a part of Tulane University and was created in the fall of 2005, pursuant to a university-wide Renewal Plan which in part separated the School of Liberal Arts from the School of Science and Engineering. Brian T. Edwards is the current dean of the School of Liberal Arts, where he is also professor of English, after joining Tulane in 2018. Prior to that, Carole Haber, professor of History at the School, served as dean from 2008 to 2018.

Scope
The School of Liberal Arts encompasses the fine arts, humanities, and social sciences through 16 departments and 19 interdisciplinary programs as well as the Carroll Gallery, Shakespeare Festival, Summer Lyric Theatre, and the Middle American Research Institute. The School of Liberal Arts is the largest of Tulane's nine schools with the greatest number of enrolled students, faculty members, majors, minors, and graduate programs. The academic departments include Anthropology, Art (Studio and Art History), Classical Studies, Communication, Economics, English, French and Italian, German and Slavic Studies, History, Music, Philosophy, Political Science, Sociology, Spanish and Portuguese, Theatre and Dance. SLA departments and programs are currently housed in Newcomb Hall, the Woldenberg Art Center, Dixon Hall, and McWilliams Hall located on the Newcomb Quad as well as Dinwiddie, Tilton, Hebert, Jones, and Norman Mayer Halls located on the Academic Quad.

Notable professors
William Balée
Elizabeth Hill Boone
William Craft Brumfield
James Carville
Peter Cooley
Scott Cowen
Kenneth W. Harl
Adeline Masquelier
Tom Sancton
John Verano

Notable alumni 

 Blake Bailey, American writer (BA '85)
Sean M. Berkowitz, American prosecutor (BA '89)
 Lindy Boggs, American politician (Newcomb College, BA '35)
 Andrew Breitbart, American conservative writer and publisher (BA in American Studies '91)
Ian Bremmer, American political scientist (BA in International Relations '89)
 Neil Bush, American businessman and investor (BA in Economics '77)
 Amy Carter, daughter of the thirty-ninth U.S. President Jimmy Carter and his first lady Rosalynn Carter (BA in Art History '96)
 Doug Ellin, American screenwriter and film and TV director (BA '90)
 Francis George OMI, American cardinal of the Roman Catholic Church (PhD in Philosophy '70)
 Newt Gingrich, American politician and author (MA '68 and PhD '71 in European History)
 Paul Michael Glaser, American actor and director (BA in Theater and English '66)
 Shirley Ann Grau, American writer (Newcomb College, BA '50)
 Scott Greenstein, president of Sirius XM Radio (BA ’81)
 Lauren Hutton, American model and actress (Newcomb College, BA '64)
 Victoria Reggie Kennedy, American attorney and activist (Newcomb College, BA '76)
 Bruce Paltrow, American television and film director and producer (BA in Painting ’65)
 Michael Price, American writer and television producer (MFA in Theater '86)
 Richard Rudolph, American songwriter and musician (BA ’68)
 Terry Schnuck, American Tony-winner theater producer (BA '75)
 Jerry Springer, English-born American television personality (BA in Political Science '65)
 Harold Sylvester, American film and television actor (BA in Theater and Psychology '72)
 John Kennedy Toole, American novelist (BA in English '58)
 Linda S. Wilson, American scholar (Newcomb College, BA '57)

See also
H. Sophie Newcomb Memorial College
Tulane University

References

External links
Official website

Tulane University
Educational institutions established in 2005
2005 establishments in Louisiana